The Romano R.3 was a French experimental seaplane built by Romano in the 1920s. It featured a biplane layout.

Specifications

References

1920s French experimental aircraft
R.3
Aircraft first flown in 1924
Biplanes
Single-engined tractor aircraft
Floatplanes